Humbert of Salins (905 – 957/58), also named Humbert of Mâcon, was Lord of Salins (present eastern France) from 943 to 957.

He was the second son of Aubry I of Mâcon and Tolana of the House of Salins. He married Wandelmodis, daughter of Gui d'Escuens, with whom he had:
 Humbert II
 Adela, mother of Wandalmodis, who was married in 985 to Engelbert III de Brienne
 Vandelmode (died 957) married Beraud de Beaujeu (died before 967).

References 

905 births
950s deaths
Year of death uncertain
Lords of France